Frederikke Dahl Hansen (born 26 March 1994) is a Danish television and film actress best known for her role in the film Copenhagen as Effy.

Life and career 
Frederikke Dahl Hansen was born in Copenhagen, Denmark. She began her acting career in 2008 by appearing in the short film . She later went on to star in movies such as You & Me Forever as Maria, Rebounce (2011) as Louise, Teenland, and in Copenhagen as Effy. She is also well recognized for her recurring roles in shows like  and Heartless.

Awards
In 2013, she was awarded the title of Best Actress in a Supporting Role at the Bodil Awards for her appearance as Maria in You & Me Forever.

References

External links
 https://www.imdb.com/name/nm3141662/
 https://www.monstersandcritics.com/movies/filmmaker-mark-raso-takes-two-bigs-risks-and-wins-in-copenhagen/
 https://wn.com/Frit_Fald_Interview_med_Frederikke_Dahl_Hansen
 http://www.filmweb.pl/person/Frederikke+Dahl+Hansen-1301526

1994 births
Living people
Danish film actresses
Danish television actresses
Best Supporting Actress Bodil Award winners